The First Federal Parliament of Nepal, consisting of the House of Representatives and the National Assembly, was elected via the 2017 legislative, provincial and local elections.

165 members were elected via first-past-the-post system and 110 through the proportional representation system to form the 275-member House of Representatives for a five-year term. On 7 February 2018, the provincial electoral colleges, composed of provincial assembly members elected in the provincial elections and chairs and deputy-chairs of local administrative units elected in the local elections, elected eight members each, for a total of 56 elected members, and three more were appointed by the President as nominated by the government, to form the 59 member National Assembly. The National Assembly members drew lots to determine the thirds whose terms would be of two, four and six years respectively.

On 23 January 2020, the National Assembly electoral college met for the second time to elect 18 of the 19 Class I members. The electoral college met again on 26 January 2022 to elect 20 members of the 2nd Class.

The House of Representatives was dissolved on 20 December 2020 by President Bidya Devi Bhandari on the request of Prime Minister K.P. Sharma Oli's cabinet. The House was reinstated on 24 February 2021 following a decision by the Supreme Court of Nepal. The House of Representatives was again dissolved on 22 May 2021 by President Bidya Devi Bhandari and was reinstated again on 12 July 2021 by the Supreme Court. The parliament was dissolved on 18 September 2022 after completing its five-year term.

Leaders

House of Representatives

Office bearers 
 Speaker of the House of Representatives:
 Rt. Hon. Krishna Bahadur Mahara (until 1 October 2019)
 Rt. Hon. Agni Prasad Sapkota (from 26 January 2020)
 Deputy Speaker of the House of Representatives:
 Hon. Shiva Maya Tumbahamphe (until 20 January 2020)
 Hon. Pushpa Bhusal Gautam (from 15 July 2022)
 Prime Minister of Nepal:
Rt. Hon. KP Sharma Oli (until 13 July 2021) (CPN (UML))
Rt. Hon. Sher Bahadur Deuba (since 13 July 2021) (Nepali Congress) 
 Leader of the Opposition:
Rt. Hon. Sher Bahadur Deuba (until 13 July 2021) (Nepali Congress) 
Rt. Hon. KP Sharma Oli (since 13 July 2021) (CPN (UML))

Parliamentary party leaders 

 Parliamentary party leader of Nepali Congress: Sher Bahadur Deuba
 Deputy parliamentary party leader: Bijay Kumar Gachhadar
 Parliamentary party leader of CPN (UML): KP Sharma Oli
 Deputy parliamentary party leader: Subhash Chandra Nemwang
Parliamentary party leader of CPN (Maoist Centre): Pushpa Kamal Dahal
Parliamentary party leader of CPN (Unified Socialist): Madhav Kumar Nepal
Parliamentary party leader of People's Socialist Party: Upendra Yadav
Parliamentary party leader of Loktantrik Samajwadi Party: Mahantha Thakur

Whips 

 Chief Whip (Nepali Congress):
 Bal Krishna Khand (until 12 July 2021)
 Chitra Lekha Yadav (from 20 July 2022)
 Whip (Nepali Congress):
 Pushpa Bhusal (until 15 July 2022)
 Min Bishwakarma (from 20 July 2022)
 Chief Whip (CPN (UML)): Bishal Bhattarai
 Whip (CPN (UML)): Shanta Chaudhary
Chief Whip (CPN (Maoist Centre)): Dev Prasad Gurung
Chief Whip (CPN (Unified Socialist)): Jeevan Ram Shrestha
 Chief Whip (People's Socialist Party):  Pramod Sah
 Chief Whip (Loktantrik Samajwadi Partyl): Umashankar Argariya

National Assembly

Office bearers 

 Chairperson of the National Assembly: Rt. Hon. Ganesh Prasad Timilsina
 Vice-Chairperson of the National Assembly: 
 Hon. Shashikala Dahal (until 4 March 2022)
 Vacant (since 4 March 2022)

Parliamentary party leaders 

 Parliamentary party leader of CPN (UML):
 Suman Raj Pyakurel (until 4 March 2022)
 Khim Lal Bhattarai (since 10 March 2022)
Parliamentary party leader of CPN (Maoist Centre):
Dina Nath Sharma (until 4 March 2022) 
Vacant (since 4 March 2022)
 Parliamentary party leader of Nepali Congress: 
Surendra Raj Pandey (until 3 March 2020)
Radheshyam Adhikari (from 10 March 2020 to 4 March 2022)
Vacant (since 4 March 2022)
Parliamentary party leader of CPN (Unified Socialist): Beduram Bhusal

Whips 

 Chief Whip of CPN (UML):
 Khim Lal Bhattarai (until 10 March 2022)
 Devendra Dahal (since 10 March 2022)
 Chief Whip of Nepali Congress:
 Sarita Prasain (until 3 March 2020)

Members of the House of Representatives

Members

Suspensions

Changes 
By-elections are held for seats that become vacant or members elected through proportional representation are replaced from the party list.

Defections

Members of the National Assembly

Retired members of the National Assembly

Explanatory notes

References

Nepal MPs 2017–2022
Members of the National Assembly (Nepal)